Anna Sychravová (7 July 1873 – 22 February 1925) was a Czechoslovakian educator and politician. In 1920 she was elected to the Chamber of Deputies, becoming one of the first group of female members, and the only one elected from Slovakia.

Biography
Sychravová was born to a clerical family in Humpolec in Austria-Hungary (now in the Czech Republic) in 1873. She became a teacher, working in Prague and Žižkov, where she also worked for the youth services of the provincial and district authorities. Following the independence of Czechoslovakia after World War I, she worked at the Ministry of Social Welfare for a year before moving to Vrútky, where she returned to teaching.

She was a candidate of the Czechoslovakian Social Democratic Workers' Party in the 1920 parliamentary elections, and was elected to the Chamber of Deputies. During her term she sat on the Cultural Committee. However, she died in February 1925 in Vinohrady hospital before her term in office was complete. Her seat was taken by Jozef Pajger.

References

1873 births
People from Humpolec
Austro-Hungarian educators
Czechoslovak civil servants
Czechoslovak educators
Czechoslovak women in politics
Members of the Chamber of Deputies of Czechoslovakia (1920–1925)
Czech Social Democratic Party MPs
1925 deaths